Jesse Ebb Rose (February 27, 1925, Houston, Texas – August 27, 2007) was an American racecar driver.

Rose raced in the USAC Championship Car series in the 1961–1963 seasons, with 4 career starts, including the 1961–1963 Indianapolis 500 races.  His best finish at Indy was in 14th position in both 1962 and 1963.

Indy 500 results

SSDI Index with entry of death

1925 births
2007 deaths
Indianapolis 500 drivers
Racing drivers from Houston